Carter Verhaeghe (born August 14, 1995) is a Canadian professional ice hockey centre for the Florida Panthers of the National Hockey League (NHL). He was drafted in the third round, 82nd overall in the 2013 NHL Entry Draft by the Toronto Maple Leafs. Verhaeghe won the Stanley Cup as a member of the Lightning in 2020.

Early life
Verhaeghe was born on August 14, 1995, in Waterdown, Ontario, Canada to parents Thomas and Karen. His father introduced him to the sport of ice hockey and he credits both sets of parents for being an influence on his career. Once he began skating, Verhaeghe started playing organized hockey through the Flamborough Hockey Association before joining the Hamilton Junior Bulldogs and Halton Hurricanes. After his family briefly lived in Toronto, Verhaeghe became a fan of the Toronto Maple Leafs and Mats Sundin. Growing up, Verhaeghe and his sister Victoria played hockey, lacrosse, and soccer.

Playing career

Junior
In his high school years, Verhaeghe competed with the St. Mary Catholic Secondary School Crusaders in the Hamilton-Wentworth Catholic league alongside future NHLer Mark Jankowski. Together, they helped the Crusaders clinch the 2010 Hamilton Junior Cup and Verhaeghe played with the senior team in grade 10. Verhaeghe also spent the 2010–11 minor midget season with the Hamilton Jr. Bulldogs of the South Central Triple-A Hockey League. Following that season, where he tallied 34 goals and 64 points through 45 games, Verhaeghe was drafted 38th overall in the 2011 OHL Priority Selection by the Niagara IceDogs.

Verhaeghe joined the IceDogs immediately following the draft and accumulated 16 points throughout the 2011–12 season. As he was playing on a strong team that finished first in the Eastern Conference, Verhaeghe saw limited playing time. He began the season with a scoring drought and he tallied his first career OHL goal came in his 18th game of the season.

Following his second season with the IceDogs in 2012–13, posting 44 points in 67 games, Verhaeghe was selected in the third round, 82nd overall in the 2013 NHL Entry Draft by the Toronto Maple Leafs. At the conclusion of the 2013–14 season with the Ice Dogs, Verhaeghe was signed to a three-year, entry-level contract with the Maple Leafs on April 2, 2014. He immediately joined AHL affiliate, the Toronto Marlies, signing an amateur tryout contract to play out the remainder of their campaign.

Matching his scoring totals from his previous season with the IceDogs, Verhaeghe scored 82 points as captain in his final season of junior in the 2014–15 season.

Professional

Toronto and New York
Prior to his first professional season, Verhaeghe was included in a multi-player trade prior to training camp by the Maple Leafs to the New York Islanders in exchange for Michael Grabner on September 18, 2015. He split the following two seasons between the Islanders affiliates' the Bridgeport Sound Tigers of the AHL and Missouri Mavericks of the ECHL.

Tampa Bay Lightning
With one year remaining on his entry-level contract, Verhaeghe was traded by the Islanders to the Tampa Bay Lightning in exchange for Kristers Gudļevskis on July 1, 2017. In the 2017–18 season with the Syracuse Crunch, Verhaeghe in his first full year in the AHL, secured a top six scoring role scoring a breakout 48 points in 58 games.

In the following 2018–19 season, Verhaeghe captured the first AHL scoring title ever by a Crunch skater, claiming the John B. Sollenberger Trophy with 82 points in 76 games. His 34 goals tied Crunch teammate Alex Barré-Boulet in league scoring to share the Willie Marshall Award. Verhaeghe holds the Crunch's single-season total point record with 82 points.

On July 5, 2019, Verhaeghe was signed to a one-year, two-way contract extension with the Lightning. On September 30, 2019, the Lightning announced that Verhaeghe had made the team's opening night roster. On October 3, 2019, Verhaeghe appeared in his first career NHL game, which came in a 5–2 Lightning win over the visiting Florida Panthers at Amalie Arena. October 5, 2019, Verhaeghe recorded his first career NHL assist and point in a 3–4 loss to the Florida Panthers at BB&T Center. On December 7, 2019, Verhaeghe recorded his first career NHL goal and first career multi-point game in a 7–1 Lightning win over the visiting San Jose Sharks at Amalie Arena. He scored his first NHL hat trick on January 7, 2020 in a 9–2 win over the Vancouver Canucks.

On August 15, 2020, Verhaeghe skated in his first career NHL playoff game. In that game Verhaeghe recorded his first career playoff assist and point. Tampa would go on to win the Stanley Cup, defeating the Dallas Stars in six games, and Verhaeghe would become the second Sound Tigers player to win the Stanley Cup.

Florida Panthers
Shortly after claiming the Championship, as an impending restricted free agent with arbitration rights and due to salary cap constraints, Verhaeghe was not tendered a qualifying offer by the Lightning and was released to explore free agency. On October 9, 2020, Verhaeghe remained in Florida, agreeing to a two-year, $2 million contract with the Florida Panthers.

In the shortened 2020–21 season, Verhaeghe would have a breakout year, scoring 36 points in 43 games with a plus-24. He would signed a three-year, $12.5 million extension with the Panthers on July 31, 2021.

During the 2022 playoffs, Verhaeghe would score 12 points, including an overtime goal in Game 6 against the Washington Capitals to give the Panthers their first playoff series win since 1996.

Career statistics

Regular season and playoffs

International

Awards and honours

References

External links
 

1995 births
Living people
Bridgeport Sound Tigers players
Canadian ice hockey centres
Florida Panthers players
Ice hockey people from Ontario
Missouri Mavericks players
Niagara IceDogs players
Sportspeople from Hamilton, Ontario
Stanley Cup champions
Syracuse Crunch players
Tampa Bay Lightning players
Toronto Maple Leafs draft picks
Toronto Marlies players